Sonja Rožman (born 1934) is a Slovenian gymnast. She competed in seven events at the 1952 Summer Olympics.

References

1934 births
Living people
Slovenian female artistic gymnasts
Olympic gymnasts of Yugoslavia
Gymnasts at the 1952 Summer Olympics
Sportspeople from Jesenice, Jesenice